

Events
 Passenger services (by horse-drawn coach) begin on the Kilmarnock & Troon Railway, the first such service in Scotland.

Births

February births
 February 16 – Joseph R. Anderson, owner of American steam locomotive manufacturing company Tredegar Iron Works (d. 1892).
 February 23 – John M. Forbes, president of the Michigan Central Railroad and the Chicago, Burlington & Quincy Railroad (d. 1898).

May births
 May 14 – Charles Beyer, German-British steam locomotive manufacturer, co-founder of Beyer, Peacock & Company (d. 1876).

September births
 September 1 – Mark Hopkins, a member of The Big Four group of financiers in California.
 September 11 - John Chester Craven, Locomotive, Carriage and Wagon Superintendent at London, Brighton & South Coast Railway's Brighton Works 1847–1870, is born (d. 1887).

Unknown date births
 Wilson Eddy, American steam locomotive manufacturer (d. 1898).

Deaths
1813, February – United Kingdom – A 13-year-old boy named Jeff Bruce was killed whilst running alongside the Middleton Railway tracks. The Leeds Mercury reported that this would "operate as a warning to others".

References

 
 White, John H., Jr. (Spring 1986), America's Most Noteworthy Railroaders, Railroad History, 154, p. 9–15.